The Carnival Museum is located on 25 de Mayo Street in the "Ciudad Vieja" (Old City) in Montevideo, Uruguay

It was built in November, 2006.

The museum has galleries on Candombe, Carnival, Uruguayan Carnival and Murga.

Photo gallery

See also 

 Uruguayan Carnival
 Candombe
 Murga

References

External links

Museo del Carnaval Official Site
Catálogo en línea del Museo del Carnaval

History museums in Uruguay
Museums in Montevideo
Circus museums
Carnivals
2006 establishments in Uruguay
Museums established in 2006
Buildings and structures completed in 2006
Articles containing video clips
Carnivals in Uruguay